Quiet Riot: Well Now You're Here, There's No Way Back is a 2014 documentary film about Los Angeles-based heavy metal and hair metal band Quiet Riot. The film was directed by former actress Regina Russell Banali. It premiered at the 2014 Newport Beach Film Festival and won the Festival Honors award for "Outstanding Achievement in Filmmaking" in the music category. It was screened out of competition at the 2015 Cannes Film Festival and aired on January 29, 2015, on Showtime.

Critical reception 
Indiewire called it "an enthralling ride".

Awards 
 Festival Honors Award for "Outstanding Achievement in Filmmaking" in the music category Newport Beach Film Festival

Distribution 
The film had its film festival premier at the 2014 Newport Beach Film Festival and world premiered on the Showtime Network January 29, 2015.

References

External links 
 
 

2014 documentary films
American documentary films
American independent films
2010s English-language films
2010s American films